Liudmyla Klipova (born 24 July 1937) is a Soviet former swimmer. She competed at the 1956 Summer Olympics and the 1960 Summer Olympics.

References

1937 births
Living people
Soviet female swimmers
Olympic swimmers of the Soviet Union
Swimmers at the 1956 Summer Olympics
Swimmers at the 1960 Summer Olympics
Sportspeople from Zaporizhzhia